KCLI (1320 AM) is a radio station licensed to Clinton, Oklahoma, United States. The station is currently owned by Wright Broadcasting Systems, Inc.

History
The station was assigned the call letters KKCC on April 14, 1980. On November 27, 1985, the station changed its call sign to KXOL and on August 5, 1996 to the current KCLI.

Translators

References

External links

CLI